Richard Casey may refer to:

Richard Casey, Baron Casey (1890–1976), Australian governor-general, politician, and diplomat
Richard C. Casey (1933–2007), U.S. district judge for the Southern District of New York
Richard Casey (Queensland politician), member of the Queensland Legislative Assembly
Dick Casey, Australian rules footballer